Julian Malo (born 2 February 1985 in Tiranë) is an Albanian professional footballer who last played as a striker for Shënkolli in the Albanian First Division.

Career

Partizani Tirana
On 30 January 2014, Malo left the club after realizing that there was no room for him in team, describing the decision as "the best for his career".

Besëlidhja Lezhë
Malo joined Albanian First Division side Besëlidhja Lezhë in August 2014 ahead of the 2014–15 season, where he signed a one-year contract and had hoped to help the club secure promotion to the Albanian Superliga. He made his debut for the club in the opening round of the Albanian First Division on 27 September 2014 in a 1–0 win over KS Burreli, and he scored his first goal for the club in the next league game, which was the only goal of an away game against Ada Velipojë.

Kastrioti Krujë
He joined an ambitious Kastrioti Krujë side ahead of the 2015–16 Albanian First Division season.

Shënkolli
On 9 September 2016, Malo joined newly promoted side Shënkolli on a one-year contract.

References

External links
 Profile - FSHF

1985 births
Living people
Footballers from Tirana
Albanian footballers
Association football forwards
FC Kamza players
KF Teuta Durrës players
KF Laçi players
FK Kukësi players
FK Partizani Tirana players
Besëlidhja Lezhë players
KS Kastrioti players
KF Shënkolli players
Kategoria Superiore players
Kategoria e Parë players